"Going Out for a Walk", is an essay by Max Beerbohm, written in 1918 and was published in 1920 in the essay collection And Even Now. The essay fights the notion that taking a walk is a matter of the brain needing release and more so conflicted when there is a talkative companion.

Summary
The main plot of the essay is the challenge of the common notion that taking a walk is a productive activity useful for the brain, Beerbohm makes the case that taking a walk, on the contrary prevents the mind from intelligent thought. Beerbohm's reasoning is that while walking, you almost lose a part of your train of thought, as you are unconsciously thinking about walking. Beerbohm that in London the loud noises of the city save him from the need to make up excuses when someone asks him out for a walk, but the solace of the country can cause a “walk monger” to insist on talking a walk.

Not having an excuse to not take a walk cause Beerbohm to veer from the comfort of a reading chair, which is a disruption that he finds is not progressive. He claims even the most intelligent writers lose train of thought soon as they start walking and conversations eventually lead to dull topics and gossip. Beerbohm concludes the essay by claiming that he does not believe that physical exercise is bad for you "taken moderately, it is rather good for one, physically". but condemns taking a walk that lacks reason and would rather take another form of transportation.

References

Essays by Max Beerbohm
British essays
1918 essays
1920 essays
Essays in semiotics
Philosophy essays